Fasito'o Uta is a village situated on the northwest coast of Upolu island in Samoa. The village is part of A'ano Alofi 2 Electoral Constituency (Faipule District) which forms part of the larger A'ana political district.

The population of Fasito'o Uta is 2147.

Notable people
Aiono Fanaafi Le Tagaloa

References

Populated places in A'ana